Eli Thayer (June 11, 1819 – April 15, 1899) was a Republican member of the United States House of Representatives from 1857 to 1861. He was born in Mendon, Massachusetts. He graduated from Worcester Academy in 1840, from Brown University in 1845, and in 1848 founded Oread Institute, a school for young women in Worcester, Massachusetts. He is buried at Hope Cemetery, Worcester.

He is chiefly remembered for his crusade to ensure that the Kansas Territory would enter into the United States as a free state. With this aim in view, early in 1854 Thayer organized the Massachusetts Emigrant Aid Company to send anti-slavery settlers to the Kansas Territory. In 1855, this organization joined with the New York Emigrant Aid Company and the name was changed to the New England Emigrant Aid Company. The motives of Thayer in establishing the New England Emigrant Aid Company were questioned by historian David S. Reynolds, who wrote that Thayer "opposed slavery not on moral grounds but because [he] wanted to foster laissez-faire capitalism in the Territory."

Local leagues were established whose members emigrated to Kansas and established towns. The Company provided hotels for temporary accommodation (such as the Free State Hotel in Lawrence) and provided sawmills and other improvements. Settlements were established at Manhattan, Lawrence, Topeka, and Osawatomie. The clash of these settlers and other "Free-Stater" Northerners with pro-slavery settlers spawned the violence of Bleeding Kansas.

Thayer wanted to establish an antislavery colony in Virginia, but land was too expensive. He then looked to western Virginia. Thayer chose to build his colony at the mouth of Twelvepole Creek in Wayne County, Virginia (now West Virginia). He named his town Ceredo after the goddess Ceres. The town was founded in 1857.

He enlisted fellow abolitionist Zopher D. Ramsdell to settle there and establish a boot and shoe factory. Ramsdell's house is open (2022) as a historic house museum.

Eli Thayer died at his home in Worcester on April 15, 1899.

Books by Thayer

References

External links
 
 

1819 births
1899 deaths
Bleeding Kansas
Worcester Academy alumni
Politicians from Worcester, Massachusetts
People from Mendon, Massachusetts
American abolitionists
Brown University alumni
Republican Party members of the United States House of Representatives from Massachusetts
19th-century American politicians
Burials at Hope Cemetery (Worcester, Massachusetts)